The 2017 Dublin Senior Football Championship was the 131st edition of Dublin GAA's premier gaelic football tournament for senior clubs in County Dublin, Ireland. 32 teams participate, with the winner representing Dublin in the Leinster Senior Club Football Championship.

This was Fingallians return to the top flight of Dublin football after a 5-year exodus.

St. Vincent's were the defending Dublin (and Leinster champions) having defeated Castleknock in the 2016 Dublin championship final.

Format

Senior Football Championship

The Senior Football Championship has a straight knock-out format.

Senior Football Championship Tournament

 The losers of the round 1 matches enter the Senior Football Championship Tournament.
 The losers of round 1 matches of the Senior Football Championship Tournament enter a relegation playoff if a non-reserve side wins the Dublin Intermediate Football Championship.

Team Changes
The following teams have changed division since the 2016 championship season –

Promoted to 2017 Senior Football Championship from 2016 Intermediate Football Championship
 Fingallians

Relegated from 2016 Senior Football Championship to 2017 Intermediate Football Championship
 O'Tooles

Senior Football Championship

Round 1
All 32 teams enter the championship at this stage. The 16 winning teams advance to round 2 while the 16 losing teams exit the Senior 'A' Football Championship and enter the Senior 'B' Football Championship.

Round 2
The 16 winners of the first round matches play each other. The 8 winners proceed to the quarter-finals while the 8 losers exit the championship.

Quarter-finals

Semi-finals

Final

Senior Football Championship Tournament

The Dublin Senior 'B' Football Championship has been renamed as the Senior Football Championship Tournament.

SFC Tournament Round 1

The 16 losers from the First Round play off in this round. The 8 winners proceed to the SFC Tournament Quarter-Finals while the 8 losers exit the championship. One team is designated home advantage for each tie in a random draw.

SFC Tournament Quarter-Finals

SFC Tournament Semi-Finals

SFC Tournament Final

References

References

External links
Dublin GAA Fixtures & Results
Live Updates and Scores

Dublin Senior Football Championship
Dublin Senior Football Championship